Denote a binary response index model as: ,  where .

Description
This type of model is applied in many economic contexts, especially in modelling the choice-making behavior. For instance,   here denotes whether consumer   chooses to purchase a certain kind of chocolate, and   includes many variables characterizing the features of consumer  . Through function  , the probability of choosing to purchase is determined.

Usually, there are two different types of hypothesis needed to be tested in binary response index model.

The first type is testing the multiple exclusion restrictions, namely, testing . If the unrestricted MLE can be easily computed, it is convenient to use the Wald test  whose test statistic is constructed as:

Where D is a diagonal matrix with the last Q diagonal entries as 0 and others as 1. If the restricted MLE can be easily computed, it is more convenient to use the Score test (LM test).
If the MLE can be computed easily under both of the restricted and unrestricted models, Likelihood-ratio test is also a choice: let  denote the value of the log-likelihood function under the unrestricted model and let  denote the value under the restricted model, then  has an asymptotic  distribution.

In most of the cases, it is not easy or even feasible to compute the MLE under the restricted model when   include some complicated nonlinear functions. Hence, Wald test is usually used to deal with this problem. The test statistic is constructed as:

For the tests with very general and complicated alternatives, the formula of the test statistics might not have the exactly same representation as above. But we can still derive the formulas as well as its asymptotic distribution by Delta method and implement Wald test, Score test or Likelihood-ratio test. Which test should be used is determined by the relative computation difficulty of the MLE under restricted and unrestricted models.

References

Categorical regression models
M-estimators
Maximum likelihood estimation
Probability distribution fitting